Hits is a 1996 greatest hits compilation by Canadian singer-songwriter Joni Mitchell. , it has sold 488,000 copies in the United States, and was certified Gold in the United Kingdom in 2013 for 100,000 copies sold. A counterpart album, Misses, was released on the same day as Hits. It consists of Mitchell's lesser known songs that she considers personal favorites.

Track listing

Charts

Certifications

References

1996 greatest hits albums
Joni Mitchell compilation albums
Geffen Records compilation albums